The Working Conditions (Hotels and Restaurants) Convention, 1991, officially the Convention concerning Working Conditions in Hotels, Restaurants and similar Establishments is an International Labour Organization Convention adopted in 1991 during the 78 International Labour Conference.

It sets standards for work in hotels and restaurants. According to the convention, workers have a right to "reasonable normal hours of work" and "minimum daily and weekly rest periods", compensation (in time or remuneration) of work on holidays. Furthermore a basic remuneration should be paid in regular intervals, regardless of tips.

Ratifications
As of December 2022, 16 countries were party to the convention: Austria, Barbados, Cyprus, Dominican Republic, Fiji, Germany, Guyana, Iraq, Ireland, Lebanon, Luxembourg, Mexico, the Netherlands (for Curaçao, Sint Maarten and the Caribbean Netherlands), Spain, Switzerland and Uruguay.

See also
 List of International Labour Organization Conventions

References

External links 
Convention text
Parties

International Labour Organization conventions
Occupational safety and health treaties
Treaties concluded in 1991
Treaties entered into force in 1994
Treaties extended to the Netherlands Antilles
Treaties of Austria
Treaties of Barbados
Treaties of Cyprus
Treaties of the Dominican Republic
Treaties of Fiji
Treaties of Germany
Treaties of Guyana
Treaties of Ba'athist Iraq
Treaties of Ireland
Treaties of Lebanon
Treaties of Luxembourg
Treaties of Mexico
Treaties of Spain
Treaties of Switzerland
Treaties of Uruguay
Treaties of the Netherlands
1991 in labor relations